The flora of the Philippines boasts a diverse array of plant species given its location in the great Malaysian flora. The Malaysian Phytogeographic zone is considered to be one of the most important centers for plant diversity because of the multitude and variance of species occupying that zone. The archipelago is isolated by  a continental and deep ocean. 

At the very least, one-third of the more than 9,250 vascular plant species native to the country are endemic. There are, however, no plant families endemic to the country. The families of gingers, begonias, gesneriads, orchids, pandans, palms, and dipterocarps are particularly high in endemic species. For example, two-thirds of the 150 species of palms present in the country are found nowhere else in the world. There are over 137 genera and about 998 species of orchids so far recorded in the Philippines as of 2007.

The broad lowland and hill rain forests of the Philippines, which are mostly gone today, were dominated by at least 45 species of dipterocarps. These massive trees were abundant to up to 1,000 meters above sea level. Considering the dipterocarps originated in India and Malaysia, the existence of the trees in the archipelago demonstrates a connection between the Philippines and western Malaysia. Other important tree species here include giant figs, which provide food for fruit bats, parrots, and monkeys, and Pterocarpus indicus, which like the dipterocarps, is valued for its timber.

Due to environmental changes, finding new species has become more urgent so the island can have an accurate reading of flora and fauna record.

A few species of Rafflesia are found in the Philippines, one of them being Rafflesia philippensis.

List 

 Abaca – Musa textilis
 Acacia
 Almaciga – Agathis philippinensis
 Atis – Annona squamosa
 Ayangile – Acacia confusa
 Banaba – Lagerstroemia speciosa
 Banana
 Bayabas – Psidium guajava
 Breadfruit – Artocarpus altilis
 Caimito – Chrysophyllum cainito
 Calachuchi – Plumeria obtusa
 Dama de Noche – Cestrum nocturnum
 Gumamela – Hibiscus rosa-sinensis
 Guyabano – Annona muricata
 Kamagong – Diospyros blancoi
 Langka – Artocarpus heterophylla
 Lanzones – Lansium parasiticum
 Mahogany
 Makopa – Syzygium samarangense
 Mangga – Mangifera indica
 Molave – Vitex parviflora
 Narra – Philippine cedar; Pterocarpus indicus
 Niyog – Cocos nucifera
 Nipa – Nypa fruticans
 Orchid – Phalaenopsis hieroglyphica
 Pineapple – Ananas comosus
 Philippine Lily – Lilium philippinense
 Pomelo – Citrus maxima
 Rafflesia
 Rattan – Calamus
 Sampaguita – Jasminum sambac
 Santan – Ixora coccinea
 Sugarcane
 Talong punay – Datura metel
 Tayabak – Strongylodon macrobotrys
 Tobacco
 Tuba-tuba – Jatropha curcas
 Ube – Dioscorea alata
 Waling-waling – Euanthe sanderiana
 Yakal – Shorea astylosa
 Ylang-ylang – Cananga odorata

See also
 Wildlife of the Philippines
 List of the orchids of the Philippines

References